Karagöl-Sahara National Park, established on August 31, 1994, is a national park in the Şavşat district of Artvin Province, Turkey. It is located in the Black Sea Region and formed by two separate areas, namely Karagöl and Sahara plateau.

References

External links
 Online profile of Karagöl-Sahara National Park

National parks of Turkey
Geography of Artvin Province
Landforms of Artvin Province
Tourist attractions in Artvin Province
Şavşat District
1994 establishments in Turkey
Protected areas established in 1994